Żurawica  is a village in Przemyśl County, Subcarpathian Voivodeship, in south-eastern Poland. It is the seat of the gmina (administrative district) called Gmina Żurawica.

In 2006 the village had a population of 4,702.

References

Villages in Przemyśl County